Ciprian Florin Brata (born 24 March 1991) is a Romanian footballer who plays as a midfielder for CSM Satu Mare. In his career, Brata also played for teams such as: Silvania Șimleu, Pandurii Târgu Jiu and Olimpia Satu Mare, among others.

Honours
ACSF Comuna Recea
Liga III : 2019–20

References

External links
 
 

1991 births
Living people
Sportspeople from Satu Mare
Romanian footballers
Romania youth international footballers
Romania under-21 international footballers
Association football midfielders
Liga I players
Liga II players
FC Olimpia Satu Mare players
CS Pandurii Târgu Jiu players
FC Brașov (1936) players
CS Turnu Severin players
FC Botoșani players
CS Minaur Baia Mare (football) players
CS Academica Recea players